McKay House may refer to:

McKay House (Owenton, Kentucky), listed on the NRHP in Owen County, Kentucky 
Ellas-McKay House, Clarendon, Arkansas, listed on the NRHP in Monroe County, Arkansas
McKay-Thornberry House, Owensboro, Kentucky, listed on the NRHP in Daviess County, Kentucky 
Donald McKay House, Boston, Massachusetts, listed on the NRHP in Boston, Massachusetts
Strawberry Patch-McKay House, Madison, Mississippi, listed on the NRHP in Madison County, Mississippi 
Claude McKay Residence, New York, New York, listed on the NRHP in New York City 
John A. McKay House and Manufacturing Company, Dunn, North Carolina, listed on the NRHP in Harnett County, North Carolina
Summer Villa and the McKay-Salmon House, Lillington, North Carolina, listed on the NRHP in Harnett County, North Carolina
Moses McKay House, Waynesville, Ohio, listed on the NRHP in Warren County, Ohio